George English may refer to:

 George English (tenor) (1882–1972), Australian tenor soloist, conductor and composer
 George Selwyn English (1912–1980), Australian composer, son of the latter
 George W. English (1866–1941), United States federal judge
 George Bethune English (1787–1828), American adventurer, diplomat, soldier, and convert to Islam
 George English (politician) Member of the Alabama House of Representatives 1878